The Sutton River is a tributary of the south shore of Hudson Bay, crossing the Kenora District, in Northwestern Ontario, in Canada.

This watercourse rises at the mouth of Lake Sutton. From there, the current crosses the "Sutton Narrows", then Lake Hawley. The course of the river crosses large areas of marshland.

This river has two main tributaries: Aquatuk River, Warchesku River.

See also 
 Kenora District, an administrative region of Ontario
 Hudson Bay
 Aquatuk River
 Warchesku River
 Polar Bear Provincial Park
 List of rivers of Ontario

References

External links 

Rivers of Ontario
Kenora District
Hudson Bay